God of Thunder is an EP by White Zombie which was released in 1989 by Caroline Records. It was the band's first release with Jay Yuenger on guitar. EP contains "God of Thunder", originally a Kiss song from their 1976 album Destroyer, and "Disaster Blaster II", a reworked version of "Disaster Blaster" from their 1989 album Make Them Die Slowly.

Music
The release was a shift from the traditional heavy metal style of Make Them Die Slowly to the more groove-oriented sound of their next release La Sexorcisto: Devil Music, Vol. 1.

"Star Slammer", which was originally cut from the Make Them Die Slowly recording sessions, was also re-recorded around the time of this EP's release. However, it was left off the EP.

Release and reception

In an interview on Loudwire, Rob Zombie denied making the album cover to provoke Gene Simmons in order to gain press coverage. In fact, Simmons never filed any sort of lawsuit or complaint against the band for the cover art of the album. On May 31, 2006, Zombie fronted a supergroup which performed "God of Thunder" at the VH1 Rock Honors.

Everett True of Melody Maker magazine gave the EP an enthusiastic and unconventional review, stating, "THIS one kicks some serious ass. I think that's all you need to know." The record has remained popular with fans of the band's later work due to it being stylistically similar to La Sexorcisto.

Track listing

Sample overview

Personnel
Adapted from the God of Thunder liner notes.

White Zombie
 Ivan de Prume – drums
 Sean Yseult – bass
 Jay Yuenger – guitar
 Rob Zombie – vocals, illustrations

Production and additional personnel
 Tom Coyne – mastering
 Greg Gordon – engineering
 Daniel Rey – producer
 Warren Shaw – assistant engineering
 Ernesto Urdaneta – cover art, photography

Release history

References

External links 
 

1989 EPs
White Zombie (band) albums
Caroline Records EPs
Albums produced by Daniel Rey
Albums recorded at Chung King Studios